William F. Smith may refer to:

 William F. Smith (American football) (1888–?), American college football player and coach
 William F. Smith (New York politician) (1901–1950), American lawyer and politician
 William Farrar Smith (1824–1903), Union Army general
 William Francis Smith (1904–1968), U.S. District Court judge
 William French Smith (1917–1990), U.S. Attorney General
 William Forgan Smith (1887–1952), Premier of the Australian state of Queensland 
 William F. Smith, Jr. (died 1945), lieutenant colonel in the U.S. Army Air Forces who died in the 1945 Empire State Building B-25 crash

See also
 William Smith (disambiguation)